The West Pomeranian Voivodeship, also known as the West Pomerania Province, is a voivodeship (province) in northwestern Poland. Its capital and largest city is Szczecin. Its area equals 22 892.48 km² (8,838.84 sq mi), and in 2021, it was inhabited by 1,682,003 people.

It was established on 1 January 1999, out of the former Szczecin and Koszalin Voivodeships and parts of Gorzów, Piła and Słupsk Voivodeships, pursuant to the Polish local government reforms adopted in 1998. It borders on Pomeranian Voivodeship to the east, Greater Poland Voivodeship to the southeast, Lubusz Voivodeship to the south, the German federal-states of Mecklenburg-West Pomerania and Brandenburg to the west, and the Baltic Sea to the north.

Geography and tourism

West Pomeranian Voivodeship is the fifth largest voivodeship of Poland in terms of area. Among the largest cities, of the region, are the capital Szczecin, as well as Koszalin, Stargard, and Świnoujście.

This is a picturesque region of the Baltic Sea coast, with many beaches, lakes and woodlands. Szczecin, Świnoujście and Police are important ports. Other major seaside towns include Międzyzdroje, Dziwnów, Kołobrzeg, and Mielno.

West Pomerania is considered one of the greenest regions of Poland, and one of the most attractive for tourists. It is characterized by incredible diversity of the landscape: beaches, hundreds of lakes, and forests full of wildlife (e.g. Wkrzanska Forest), spreading mainly up the hills of the glacial lakes areas. West Pomerania is also rich in various forms and styles of architecture that were built during the Middle Ages as well as the Gothic, Baroque, and Renaissance periods. There is a diverse repertoire of theaters, festivals, museums and galleries. During a few-day long annual Sea Festival in Szczecin, a number of free open-air concerts take place. In Świnoujście during the summer, the FAMA Academic Youth Arts Festival takes place – an event with several years of tradition, which attracts not only young people but also older alumni. In Międzyzdroje, there is a Festival Of The Stars, which draws many popular actors. In Wolin, a Viking Festival takes place, which draws "Vikings" from all across Europe.

Another draw to the area is a wide array of health resorts. Brine and peloid, discovered in the 19th century, together with geothermal water resources, are popular attractions in Świnoujście, Kamień Pomorski and Połczyn Zdrój.

A notable phenomenon on a worldly scale is the Crooked Forest outside the town of Gryfino.

Cities and towns 

The voivodeship contains 5 cities and 61 towns. These are listed below in descending order of population (according to official figures for 2019):

The Polish districts of the historical region Western Pomerania (the 3 westernmost districts of the West Pomeranian Voivodeship) had a population of about 520,000 in 2012 (cities of Szczecin, Świnoujście and Police County combined) – while the German districts had a population of about 470,000 in 2012 (Vorpommern-Rügen and Vorpommern-Greifswald combined). So overall, about 1 million people live in the historical region of Western Pomerania today, while the Szczecin agglomeration reaches even further.

Administrative division 
West Pomeranian Voivodeship is divided into 21 counties (powiats): 3 city counties and 18 land counties. These are further divided into 114 gminas.

The counties are listed in the following table (ordering within categories is by decreasing population in 2019):

Protected areas

Protected areas in West Pomeranian Voivodeship include two National Parks and seven Landscape Parks. These are listed below.
Drawno National Park (partly in Lubusz and Greater Poland Voivodeships)
Wolin National Park
Barlinek-Gorzów Landscape Park (partly in Lubusz Voivodeship)
Cedynia Landscape Park
Drawsko Landscape Park
Ińsko Landscape Park
Lower Odra Valley Landscape Park
Szczecin Landscape Park
Ujście Warty Landscape Park (partly in Lubusz Voivodeship)

Demography 
After Germany's defeat in World War II, the region became part of Poland by way of the Potsdam Agreement, which created territorial changes demanded by the Soviet Union.

In 1948 67 percent of the populace originated from Central Poland, Greater Poland and Pomeralia while 25 percent came from the Polish areas annexed by the Soviet Union. Another 6 percent returned to Poland from Western Europe. About 50,000 Ukrainians were forcefully resettled to West Pomerania in the Operation Vistula in 1947.

Education and science

 University of Szczecin (Polish Uniwersytet Szczeciński) with 35,000 students
 Technical University in Koszalin with 14,000 students
 West Pomeranian University of Technology in Szczecin with 15,300 students, formed as a result of merger of Szczecin University of Technology and University of Agriculture in Szczecin
 Pomeranian Medical University with 4,000 students
 The Szczecin Academy of Arts
 Maritime University of Szczecin
 The West Pomeranian Business School with 3,000 students
 Szczeciński Park Naukowo-Technologiczny (science park in Szczecin)

Economy 
The Gross domestic product (GDP) of the province was 18.3 billion euros in 2018, accounting for 3.7% of Polish economic output. GDP per capita adjusted for purchasing power was 17,700 euros or 59% of the EU27 average in the same year. The GDP per employee was 67% of the EU average.

Industrial, science and technology parks
Goleniowski Park Przemysłowy (industrial park in Goleniów)
Infrapark Police (industrial park in Police, Poland)
Stargardzki Park Przemysłowy (industrial park in Stargard)
Szczeciński Park Naukowo-Technologiczny (science park in Szczecin)

Transportation 
There are two main international road routes that pass through the voivodeship: National road 3 (Poland) Świnoujście-Szczecin-Gorzów Wielkopolski-Zielona Góra-Legnica-Czech border (part of European route E65 from Swedish Malmö to Chaniá in Greece) and National road 6 (Poland) Szczecin-Koszalin-Słupsk-Gdańsk (part of European route E28 from Berlin to Minsk). 
Most of the National road 3 in the voivodeship is in a standard of an expressway (Expressway S3 (Poland)). The National road 6 between German border and Rzęśnica is in the standard of autostrada (A6 autostrada (Poland)), whereas part between Rzęścnica and Goleniów and bypasses of Goleniów and Nowogard are in standards of an expressway (Expressway S6 (Poland)).
Other important national roads are National road 10 (Poland) (German border-Szczecin-Piła-Bydgoscz-Toruń-Płońsk) and National road 11 (Poland) (Kołobrzeg-Koszalin-Piła-Poznań-Bytom).
Apart from the above, some other national roads are located in the voivodeship. The voivodeship possesses also a well-developed network of regional roads.

Main railways in the province are line no. 351 Szczecin-Poznań, line no. 273 Szczecin-Wrocław (so-called “Odra railway”), line no. 202 Stargard-Gdańsk, line no. 401 Szczecin-Świnoujście and line no. 404 Kołobrzeg-Szczecinek.
The main railway stations of the province are Szczecin main station, Stargard and Koszalin. The stations are served by fast PKP Intercity trains which connect them with the capital Warsaw, as well as other major Polish cities. 
In addition to these fast express services, inter-regional trains and intra-regional trains are operated by the firm Przewozy Regionalne.
Szczecin main station possesses international train connections with Berlin, Schwerin and Lübeck (operated by DB Regio). Świnoujście has a direct train connection with Stralsund, which is operated by Usedomer Bäderbahn.

The only domestic and international airport in West Pomeranian Voivodeship is Szczecin-Goleniów "Solidarność" Airport. Also, part of the runway of an abandoned airport in Bagicz (near Kołobrzeg) was converted to an airport licensed to service planes carrying not more than 20 passengers on board.

Gallery

See also

 Dukes of Pomerania
 History of Pomerania
 Karwowo Lake
 Pomeranian (disambiguation)
 Prussia's Province of Pomerania
 Province of Pomerania (1653-1815)

Notes

References

External links
 Westpomeranian System of Tourist Information
 The Parliament of the Westpomeranian Voivodeship
 Marshal's Office of the Westpomeranian Voivodeship
 Voivode's Office of the Westpomeranian Voivodeship
 Zrot : Official Tourism Site (Polish, English, German)
 Zart : Good Tourism Site (Polish, English, German)

 
States and territories established in 1999
1999 establishments in Poland
Pomerania